Hubert Brown may refer to:

Hubert G. Brown (born 1943), American civil rights leader
Hubie Brown (born 1933), former American basketball coach
Hubert Brown (politician), Northern Irish politician

See also
Bert Brown (disambiguation)